Alexa Guarachi and Erin Routliffe were the defending champions, however Guarachi chose to compete at the 2019 Grand Prix SAR La Princesse Lalla Meryem instead. Routliffe played alongside Allie Kiick, but lost in the semifinals to Madison Brengle and Lauren Davis.

Asia Muhammad and Taylor Townsend won the title, defeating Brengle and Davis in the final, 6–2, 6–2.

Seeds

Draw

Draw

References
Main Draw

LTP Charleston Pro Tennis - Doubles